Uğur Tütüneker (born 2 August 1963 in Bursa, Turkey) is a Turkish former footballer and manager who most recently served as the manager of Adana Demirspor. After migrating to Germany with his family, he started playing football at Bayern Munich youth academy.

Club career
Uğur Tütüneker played for Bayern Munich before joining Galatasaray in July 1986. He was spotted by the legendary Germany coach Jupp Derwall who signed him for Galatasaray. He played at Galatasaray for the rest of his career, wearing the number 7 shirt. Uğur Tütüneker retired from professional football after the 1995–96 season. In 10 seasons at Galatasaray he has played in 222 competitive matches for Galatasaray, scoring 40 goals.

During his time with the club, he was one of the Galatasaray's key players, winning 4 Turkish League Championships, 2 Turkish Cup, 3 President's Cup, 1 Prime Minister's Cup and 3 Turkish Sports Writers' Cup.

Uğur Tütüneker has been praised for his technical ability, his creative playmaking, his dribbling skills as well as his crossing ability. He was one of the key players of 1988-89 Galatasaray squad that played Semi Finals in European Champions Cup. Uğur Tütüneker scored 2 and set 1 goal up for Galatasaray in their memorable 5-0 victory against Neuchatel Xamax.

International career
Uğur Tütüneker played 18 matches for the Turkish national team scoring one goal. Uğur Tütüneker suffered injuries throughout his career, preventing him from maintaining a regular spot.

Managerial career
He began coaching at Yimpaş Yozgatspor as manager assistant in 1998. He managed Siirtspor in 1999–2000 season and his team promoted to Turkish First League. He also managed Yimpaş Yozgatspor twice, Kayseri Erciyesspor, İstanbul Büyükşehir Belediyespor and İstanbulspor. He last managed Torku Konyaspor.

Career statistics

Player

Manager

References

External links
 
 
 Uğur Tütüneker (player) at TFF.org 
 Uğur Tütüneker (manager) at TFF.org 

1963 births
Living people
Sportspeople from Bursa
Turkish footballers
Turkey international footballers
FC Bayern Munich II players
Galatasaray S.K. footballers
Bundesliga players
Süper Lig players
Turkish expatriate footballers
Turkish expatriate sportspeople in Germany
Turkish football managers
Kayserispor managers
İstanbul Başakşehir F.K. managers
Orduspor managers
Kasımpaşa S.K. managers
Süper Lig managers
Sarıyer S.K. managers
İstanbulspor managers
Konyaspor managers
Association football midfielders
Adana Demirspor managers